Harry A. "Tex" Sieben Jr. (born November 24, 1943) is an American politician who served as Speaker of the Minnesota House of Representatives and retired as a two-star Major General and Adjutant General of the Minnesota National Guard, the senior most position in and commander of the Minnesota National Guard.

Early life and education
Sieben was born in Hastings, Minnesota, and attended Hastings High School. He earned his B.A. in business administration from Winona State College (now Winona State University) in 1965, and Juris Doctor from the University of Minnesota Law School in 1968.

Legislative career 
Sieben was first elected to the Minnesota House in 1970, after beating a 16-year incumbent. Sieben's legislative career spanned seven legislative sessions over 14 years, including a four-year period as Speaker of the House (1981-1985) and culminating with elevation to Majority Leader (1984-1985).

During his tenure, Sieben represented portions of Dakota and Washington counties (1973-1985), and briefly a portion of Goodhue county (1971-1972). At various points, Sieben served on committees related to Rules and Legislative Administration, Taxes (Chair), and Government Operations (Chair), amongst others.

Sieben initially was a member of the Liberal Caucus in the officially non-partisan legislature, and later joined the Minnesota Democratic–Farmer–Labor Party when political parties were recognized in the legislature in 1975.

Military career 
Sieben's military career spans 35 years of active, reserve, and National Guard duty.

In 1968, Sieben joined the United States Army Reserve, Military Intelligence Branch. After training at Fort Dix, New Jersey, and Fort Devens, Massachusetts, Sieben was stationed to Fort Snelling, Minnesota in 1969, where he served until 1975. During this period, Sieben worked as a Morse code intercept operator and platoon leader for the Army Security Agency (ASA), the Army's signals intelligence branch.

He then received a direct commission in the Minnesota Air National Guard in April 1975. He served in the Judge Advocate General's Corps for the 133rd Airlift Wing, 148th Fighter Wing, and Headquarters Minnesota Air National Guard. In 1990, he was appointed as the state judge advocate for the Minnesota National Guard.

In 1997, he was promoted to assistant adjutant general in the Minnesota Air National Guard. In this position, Sieben was responsible for liaison with senior leadership at higher headquarters, coordination with state and federal agencies, direction of long range planning, coordination of real estate matters, and implementation of plans and programs.

In October 1998, Sieben was promoted to Brigadier General at National Guard state headquarter in St. Paul. Major General and Adjutant General Eugene Andreotti, and Sieben's uncle and former Adjutant General James Sieben, pinned the stars on Sieben's shoulders at the ceremony.

In 2003, Governor Tim Pawlenty appointed Sieben as acting adjutant general, the state's top-ranking officer. During Sieben's tenure, he was responsible for the 12,500 men and women of the Minnesota National Guard, and oversaw force deployments to Iraq, Bosnia, and Kosovo.

After retiring from the military, Sieben was invested as Civilian Aide to the Secretary of the Army for Minnesota in October 2006 at the Pentagon by Secretary of the Army Francis Harvey.

Sieben's awards and decorations include a Meritorious Service Medal, Air Force Commendation Medal, Air Force Outstanding Unit Award, Air Force Organizational Excellence Award, and Small Arms Expert Marksmanship Ribbon. Sieben also received the Minnesota Superior Volunteer Service Award.

Legal career and other work
Sieben was also a career trial attorney, practicing law in Minnesota for over 50 years. Sieben joined SiebenCarey, one of Minnesota's largest personal injury law firms, in 1969, and served as managing partner from 1983-2007.

Sieben also served on the Board of Directors of the Civilian Marksmanship Program for 24 years, including service as Secretary and Vice-Chair of the Board. Sieben also served on the Boards of the Regina Medical Center and Starbase Minnesota.

Sieben was nominated to serve on the Board of Regents of the University of Minnesota in 1997.

Personal life
Sieben is married to wife Virginia and has two children and two stepchildren. Both his brother, Mike Sieben, and niece, Katie Sieben, have served in the Minnesota State Legislature. Sieben's father, Harry Sieben Sr., was also active in Minnesota politics, and his uncle, James G. Sieben, was also Adjutant General of the Minnesota National Guard, from 1975-1988.

References

https://www.republicaneagle.com/news/governor-names-sieben-acting-general/article_46b7e574-8ea0-53dc-8fe0-df93ad7b9d7b.html

External links

Living people
1943 births
Winona State University alumni
University of Minnesota Law School alumni
People from Hastings, Minnesota
Speakers of the Minnesota House of Representatives
Democratic Party members of the Minnesota House of Representatives